Acidovorax radicis is a gram-negative, oxidase-positive, catalase-negative, motile, aerobic bacterium from the family Comamonadaceae which was isolated from the surface of sterilized wheat roots. In opposite to other Acidovorax species it has no phytopathogenic potential, moreover it has been shown that it promote plants growing activity.

References

External links
Type strain of Acidovorax radicis at BacDive -  the Bacterial Diversity Metadatabase

Comamonadaceae
Bacteria described in 2011